Michael Anthony Farmer (born July 3, 1968) is a former Major League Baseball left-handed pitcher.

Farmer played college baseball as an outfielder at Jackson State and was signed by the Philadelphia Phillies as an amateur free agent in 1989. During a blowout minor league game with the Clearwater Phillies, Farmer joked about being able to pitch. He was inserted into the game on the mound and performed well enough that the Phillies continued to give him more chances on the mound before converting him to pitching full-time in 1993.

Farmer would make his Major League Baseball debut with the Colorado Rockies on May 4, 1996, and appeared in his final game on June 8, 1996.

References

External links

Baseball players from Indiana
1968 births
Living people
Colorado Rockies players
Major League Baseball pitchers
Jackson State Tigers baseball players
KBO League pitchers
American expatriate baseball players in South Korea
Doosan Bears players
African-American baseball players
Baseball players from Gary, Indiana
Central Valley Rockies players
Clearwater Phillies players
Colorado Springs Sky Sox players
Martinsville Phillies players
New Haven Ravens players
Reading Phillies players
Spartanburg Phillies players
21st-century African-American people
20th-century African-American sportspeople